The Exorcism of God is a 2021 supernatural horror film directed by Alejandro Hidalgo and starring Will Beinbrink   and María Gabriela de Faría. The Film premiered as an official selection at the 16th edition of Fantastic Fest in Austin, Texas, and screened at the Sitges Film Festival, Fantasporto, and Screamfest. The film was awarded the "2022 International Box Office Achievement Awards" for being the highest-grossing Latino film of 2022.

Plot
Peter Williams, an American priest working in Mexico, is possessed during an exorcism and ends up committing a terrible act. Eighteen years later, the consequences of his sin come back to haunt him, unleashing the greatest battle within.

Cast

 Will Beinbrink as Father Peter Williams
 María Gabriela de Faría as  Esperanza
 Joseph Marcell as Father Michael Lewis
 Irán Castillo as Magali
 Hector Kotsifakis as Dr. Nelson
 Alfredo Herrera as Possessed Jesus
 Nuria Gil	as	Reporter

References

External links

 The Exorcism of God // rogerebert.com review
 ‘The Exorcism of God’ Review: Devilishly Demeaning // nytimes.com review
 The Exorcism of God review – a big gaudy altarpiece of demonic horror // theguardian.com review
 Interview: Alejandro Hidalgo (The Exorcism of God)

2021 films
2021 horror films
2021 horror thriller films
Supernatural drama films
American horror thriller films
American legal drama films
American supernatural horror films
Demons in film
The Devil in film
American horror drama films
Legal horror films
Religious horror films
Mexican horror thriller films
2020s English-language films
2020s American films